Archduke Ferdinand Karl of Austria, later known as Ferdinand Burg (Ferdinand Carl Ludwig Joseph Johann Maria; Vienna, 27 December 1868 – Munich, 12 March 1915) was a member of the House of Habsburg.

Biography
Ferdinand Karl was the third son of Archduke Charles Louis of Austria and Princess Maria Annunciata of Bourbon-Two Sicilies. Archduke Franz Ferdinand, whose assassination at Sarajevo on 28 June 1914 launched World War I, was his elder brother.

He served as a major-general in the Austrian Army.

Marriage and issue

Like his brother, in 1909 he concluded an unequal marriage with Bertha Czuber (1879–1979), daughter of Emanuel Czuber. Unlike his brother, he did so without the emperor's knowledge or consent, having eloped two years before the marriage was revealed publicly.

On 6 August 1911 he renounced his rights and titles as a dynast of the House of Habsburg and assumed the name of "Ferdinand Burg", at the demand of Emperor Franz Joseph. Henceforth he absented himself from the Viennese court and lived in Tyrol.

Death
By then Ferdinand Karl was suffering from tuberculosis, of which he died in 1915. He and his wife had no children. A funeral was set for him about four months after his death.

Honours
He received the following orders and decorations:

References

House of Habsburg-Lorraine
20th-century deaths from tuberculosis
1868 births
1915 deaths
Austrian princes
Tuberculosis deaths in Austria
Knights of the Golden Fleece of Austria
Knights of Malta
Recipients of the Order of the White Eagle (Russia)
Recipients of the Order of St. Anna, 1st class
Recipients of the Order of Saint Stanislaus (Russian), 1st class